Fiandraia is an extinct monotypic genus of notoungulate that lived in Uruguay during the Oligocene and the Early Miocene. It was found in the Fray Bentos Formation, in rocks dated back from the Deseadan period.

The taxonomic status of Fiandraia has been historically disputed; in 1976, its discoverer, Roselli, assigned it in the family Mesotheriidae; in 1978, in Mones & Ubilla, it was considered part of Interatheriidae;  McKenna & Bell, in 1997, placed it inside its own family, Fiandraiinae, itself part of Mesotheriidae; Flynn et al considered it, in 2005, as a member of the Toxodontidae instead of the Mesotheriinae.

References 

Notoungulates
Prehistoric placental genera
Oligocene mammals of South America
Miocene mammals of South America
Deseadan
Fossils of Uruguay
Fossil taxa described in 1976